The University of Kentucky Research and Education Center Botanical Garden, also known as the UK REC Botanical Garden, is a research farm and botanical garden for the University of Kentucky in Princeton, Kentucky.

The University's Agricultural Experiment Station was established in 1885, with the West Kentucky Substation at Princeton founded in 1925. Today the Experiment Station Farm consists of almost 1,300 acres (520 hectares) where crops such as corn, wheat, soybeans, tobacco, fruits, vegetables and ornamentals are studied. The Princeton site also includes a 10-acre (40,000 m²) orchard/vineyard, plus 2 acres (8,000 m²) of grapes, and 1.5 acres (6,000 m²) for research in small fruit trees and ornamentals.

See also
 List of botanical gardens in the United States

Botanical gardens in Kentucky
Botanical research institutes
Research institutes in Kentucky
University of Kentucky
Protected areas of Caldwell County, Kentucky
Princeton, Kentucky
Education in Caldwell County, Kentucky